Kim Chae-yeon (Hangul: 김채연; born 8 December 2006) is a South Korean figure skater. She is the 2022 CS Finlandia Trophy silver medalist. At the junior level, she is the 2022–23 Junior Grand Prix Final bronze medalist and a three-time ISU Junior Grand Prix medalist.

Personal life 
Kim was born on 8 December 2006 in Seoul, South Korea.

Career

Early years 
Kim began skating in 2017. She placed fourth in the junior category at the 2020 South Korean Championships.

In February 2021, Kim placed ninth, competing as a senior at the 2021 South Korean Championships. Due to this result, she became a member of the Korean national team.

2021–2022 season: International junior debut 
Kim made her international junior debut at the 2021 JGP France II, the second of two Junior Grand Prix events held in Courchevel in August. She placed second in both the short program and the free skate to finish second overall between American skater Isabeau Levito and Canadian Kaiya Ruiter. At her second JGP assignment of the season, the 2021 JGP Slovakia, Kim finished off the podium in fifth place.

In January 2022, Kim placed tenth in the senior women's category at the 2022 South Korean Figure Skating Championships.

2022–2023 season 
Kim opened her season back on the Junior Grand Prix circuit at the 2022 JGP Poland I, the first of two JGP events held in Gdańsk. She placed third in both segments of competition to win the bronze medal overall behind Japanese competitors Mao Shimada and Mone Chiba. The following week, Kim made her international senior debut at the 2022 CS Finlandia Trophy in Espoo. She placed third in the short program and second in the free skate, setting new personal bests in both segments of competition, as well as overall, to win the silver medal between compatriot Kim Ye-lim and Georgian skater Anastasiia Gubanova. The week after that, she competed at her second Junior Grand Prix assignment, the 2022 JGP Italy. After winning the short program in Egna, she took the silver medal behind Japan's Hana Yoshida, in the process qualifying for the 2022–23 Junior Grand Prix Final.

At the Junior Grand Prix Final in Turin, Kim placed third in the short program despite one of her triple jumps being deemed a quarter short of rotation. She was narrowly third as well in the free skate, winning the bronze medal. Kim and silver medalist Shin Ji-a were the first Korean women to medal at the event since Kim Yu-na in 2005. She noted that Kim Yu-na had inspired her to begin skating, saying "I tried to learn her choreography and her jumping technique, she is my role model."

Kim finished fourth at the 2023 South Korean Championships. However, with national champion Shin ineligible for international senior competition, South Korea's third berths at senior ISU championships were assigned to Kim. Competing at the 2023 Four Continents Championships in Colorado Springs, Kim placed third in the short program with a new personal best score of 71.39, winning a bronze small medal. She had the highest technical score in the segment. Fifth in the free skate with errors on both her triple flip attempts, she dropped to fourth place overall, 2.59 points behind bronze medalist Chiba.

Programs

Competitive highlights 
CS: Challenger Series; JGP: Junior Grand Prix

Detailed Results

Junior level 

Small medals for short and free programs awarded only at ISU Championships. Personal bests highlighted in bold.

References

External links 
 

2006 births
Living people
South Korean female single skaters
People from Namyangju